William Paine Sheffield (August 30, 1820June 2, 1907) was a United States representative and Senator from Rhode Island.

Biography
Born in New Shoreham (on Block Island), he completed preparatory studies, attended Kingston Academy, and graduated from Harvard Law School in 1843. He was admitted to the bar in 1844 and commenced practice in Newport. In 1841 and 1842 he was a delegate to the State constitutional conventions and was a member of the Rhode Island House of Representatives from 1842 to 1845, from 1849 to 1853, and from 1857 to 1861. He moved to Tiverton and returned to Newport.

Sheffield was elected as a Union candidate to the Thirty-seventh Congress (March 4, 1861 – March 3, 1863) and then resumed the practice of law; he was appointed in 1871 one of the commissioners to revise the State laws, and was a member of the State house of representatives from 1875 to 1884. He was appointed as a Republican to the U.S. Senate to fill the vacancy caused by the death of Henry B. Anthony and served from November 19, 1884, to January 20, 1885, after which he resumed the practice of his profession.

In 1892 Sheffield was elected as an honorary member of the Rhode Island Society of the Cincinnati.

Sheffield died in Newport in 1907; interment was in the Island Cemetery.

Sheffield was the father of William Paine Sheffield Jr., also a U.S. Representative from Rhode Island.

References

External links 
 

1820 births
1907 deaths
People from New Shoreham, Rhode Island
American people of English descent
Rhode Island Unionists
Unionist Party members of the United States House of Representatives from Rhode Island
Republican Party United States senators from Rhode Island
Republican Party members of the Rhode Island House of Representatives
Harvard Law School alumni
Burials in Rhode Island
Republican Party members of the United States House of Representatives from Rhode Island